Doming may refer to:

 Doming (television), defect found on some cathode ray tube televisions
 Doming, also called sinking or dapping, a metalworking technique
 Doming, geologic process
 Doming (printing), technique to apply a 3D effect to a 2D Surface
 Doming Lam, Hong Kong musician and composer